Napoléonsgaard is a hill in the commune of Rambrouch, in western Luxembourg.

Napoléonsgaard is the third-highest summit in Luxembourg and the highest point in the Canton of Redange.

History 
Napoléonsgaard (literally: "garden of Napoléon") is so-named from the plantations that were made there on the order of Napoléon Bonaparte to honor the birth of his first son in 1811 at the supposed highest point of the Département des Forêts.

Between 1905 and 1952, Napoléonsgaard was considered the highest point in Luxembourg. It was superseded by Buurgplaatz  which was itself superseded by Kneiff  in 1997.

References

External links
 

Mountains under 1000 metres
Mountains and hills of the Ardennes (Luxembourg)
Mountains and hills of the Eifel
Rambrouch